Kingsbury Creek is a stream in St. Louis County, in the U.S. state of Minnesota.

History
Kingsbury Creek is named after William W. Kingsbury, a Minnesota legislator.

See also
List of rivers of Minnesota

References

Rivers of St. Louis County, Minnesota
Rivers of Minnesota